Edward Julius Berwind (June 17, 1848 – August 18, 1936) was the founder of the Berwind-White Coal Mining Company. He was head of the company from 1886 until 1930.

Early life
Berwind was born on June 17, 1848 in Philadelphia, Pennsylvania.  He was one of five sons born to German immigrants Augusta (née Guldenferring) Berwind (1821–1904) and John Berwind (1813–1893). Among his siblings was brother Charles Frederick Berwind, the first president of Berwind-White, and sister Julia A. Berwind, a social welfare activist who in later life lived with Edward.

Berwind was appointed to the United States Naval Academy at Annapolis, Maryland in July 1865 by President Abraham Lincoln, and graduated in June 1869 as a midshipman.  He was promoted to ensign in July 1870 and to master (equivalent to the modern rank of lieutenant, junior grade) in March 1872.  He was placed on the Retired List in May 1875. While in the Navy, he served during the Franco-Prussian War and as an ensign, met the Prince of Wales, later King Edward VII, who became a lifelong friend of Berwind.

During the Grant administration, he served as a naval aide at the White House.

Career
Upon leaving the Navy, Berwind went into business with his older brother, Charles, and Judge Allison White; co-founding Berwind, White & Company, which was incorporated as Berwind-White in 1886.  Berwind worked closely with J. P. Morgan in the consolidation, reorganization, integration, and expansion of his coal mining operations.  In his day he was also considered to be the world's largest individual owner of coal mining properties. Berwind also refused to bargain with his employees, making his mines among the last open shops in the coal fields.

Berwind and Peter A. B. Widener established the New York subway system. Berwind, along with Widener, was a director of International Mercantile Marine Company which owned the White Star Line and, subsequently, the RMS Titanic.  Berwind controlled the steamship business in New York and Philadelphia and supplied much of the coal used by the ships of the US Navy. After his brother's death in 1890, Edward became sole manager of the company.

Personal life
In 1886, Berwind was married to Sarah Vesta Herminie Torrey (1856–1922), at Leghorn, Italy, where her father was U.S. consular agent.  Sarah was a daughter of Franklin Torrey, a prominent sculptor, and Sarah Lincoln (née Spinney) Torrey.  Her brother was Charles Franklin Torrey, who inherited the residue of her estate.

After the death of his wife in 1922, his sister served as hostess for Edward in New York and Newport.

He died on August 18, 1936, at his home, 2 East 64th Street in New York City.  After a funeral held at St. Thomas Church on Fifth Avenue in New York, he was buried in West Laurel Hill Cemetery in Bala Cynwyd, Pennsylvania, along with his wife, in a mausoleum (modeled after the Tower of the Winds in Athens) that was designed by Horace Trumbauer, the architect of The Elms, his summer home in Newport, Rhode Island.  His sister Julia and nephew, Charles E. Dunlap, were his principal beneficiaries.

See also
Wilmore Steamship Company
Berwind, Colorado
Berwind, West Virginia
Windber, Pennsylvania
The Elms (Newport, Rhode Island)
Old Philadelphians

References

External links

Edward Julius Berwind at Harvard
 Edward Julius Berwind at West Laurel Hill Cemetery

1848 births
1936 deaths
American energy industry businesspeople
American businesspeople in the coal industry
American people of German descent
Businesspeople from Philadelphia
Businesspeople from Newport, Rhode Island
Members of the Philadelphia Club
United States Naval Academy alumni
United States Navy officers
19th-century American businesspeople
Burials at West Laurel Hill Cemetery